Bruno Brindisi (born 3 June 1964) is an Italian comic book artist.

Biography
Brindisi was born at Salerno, and debuted in the amateur publication Truemoon. Later he started drawing erotic comics for Blue Press and Ediperiodici.

In 1991 he entered the regular staff of the horror series Dylan Dog, published by Sergio Bonelli Editore, debuting with #51, entitled "Il male". For the same publisher Brindisi also realized episodes of Nick Raider and special for Tex Willer (2002), written by Claudio Nizzi. For Dylan Dog, Brindisi was selected in particular as the artist for the 200th issue and for the 20 years celebrative one. , Brindisi has drawn a total of 39 Dylan Dog stories, including regular and special series.

In 2005-2006 he drew two albums for the French series Novikov, with script by Patrick Weber.

In 2012 he drew for Astorina the comics book Il segreto di Diabolik. In the December of the same year, again for Bonelli, he drew the one-shot La rivolta dei Sepoy, written by Giuseppe De Nardo for the series Le storie.

In 2013 he became the regular cover artist for Dylan Dog - Collezione storica a colori, a series reprinting Dylan Dog stories in color.

External links
Biography at dyalondogofili website  

1964 births
Living people
People from Salerno
Italian comics artists